Zordon is a fictional character from the Power Rangers franchise who serves as the Rangers' mentor. Zordon first appeared on the first season of Mighty Morphin Power Rangers and appeared in subsequent seasons until the conclusion of Power Rangers in Space, where he was the titular major supporting character of his saga.

Character biography
Ten thousand years ago, Zordon clashes with his nemesis, Rita Repulsa, on Earth. During their final battle, Rita traps Zordon in a time warp while Zordon seals Rita and her minions away in a "Dumpster" on the Moon. After the battle ends, Zordon, with the aid of his robot assistant, Alpha 5, creates a Command Center in the California desert outside the town of Angel Grove. He then creates the Power Morphers, the Power Coins and the Dinozords. When Rita Repulsa is released from the Dumpster, Zordon recruits five teenagers from Angel Grove – Jason Lee Scott, Zack Taylor, Kimberly Hart, Trini Kwan, and Billy Cranston – to become the Power Rangers, giving them the Power Morphers, the Power Coins, and the Dinozords to battle Rita.

Zordon guides the Rangers over several years, creating the Zeo and Turbo powers to combat the threats of the Machine Empire and Divatox. Over time, Zordon upgrades the Command Center into the Power Chamber.

Zordon and Alpha leave Earth for Eltar, leaving the Turbo Rangers under the guidance of Dimitria and her assistant, Alpha 6, but return a short while later to attend the transfer of the Turbo powers to T.J., Cassie, Carlos and Ashley.

Months after his departure, Zordon is captured by Dark Specter, who slowly drains him of his powers, leaving the former Turbo Rangers to become the Space Rangers as they try to find and rescue him. Soon afterwards, Dark Specter launches his conquest of the universe and moves Zordon to the Dark Fortress, Astronema's base. After Dark Specter is killed by Darkonda who is also killed by him, Andros, the Red Space Ranger, travels to the Dark Fortress and finds Zordon. Zordon convinces Andros to shatter his energy tube, allowing his good energy to destroy the forces of evil. Zordon's death creates an energy wave that travels throughout the universe, turning Lord Zedd, Rita, and Divatox into humans, Astronema into her former self Karone, and the other villains into sand.

In other media

Mighty Morphin Power Rangers: The Movie

In the 1995 film, Lord Zedd and Rita Repulsa free Ivan Ooze, who destroys the Command Center and Zordon's energy tube, leaving him on the verge of death. With Zordon dying, the Rangers travel to Phaedos in order to obtain the Great Power needed to revive him. After achieving their goal on Phaedos with the help of Dulcea, the Rangers return to Earth and defeat Ivan Ooze. Having succeeded, they return to the Command Center to find Zordon has died. The Rangers then use the Great Power to repair the Command Center and bring Zordon back to life.

Power Rangers (2017 film)

Bryan Cranston portrays Zordon in the 2017 film, as a mixture of motion capture and CGI. Zordon is the former Red Ranger, who has become part of the Morphing Grid after his body was destroyed by a meteor he called down to destroy renegade Green Ranger Rita Repulsa, who had destroyed the rest of his team. Millennia later, after the new Ranger team is drawn together by the Power Coins to respond to the threat of the revived Rita, Jason overhears that Zordon, who has become desperate since the new Rangers fail to come together,  intends to use the convergence of the Morphing Grid that will occur when the new Rangers connect to their powers for the first time to restore himself to a corporeal body to stop Rita. Jason then falsely accuses Zordon of using the team for his own agenda, however, after Billy Cranston is drowned by Rita after she forces him to reveal the location of the Zeo Crystal, the other four Rangers affirm their willingness to die for each other as Billy died for them, triggering the convergence Zordon anticipated, only for Zordon to sacrifice the chance to restore himself to bring Billy back to life, showing Zordon's faith in his successors. With Rita's defeat, Zordon congratulates the Rangers, assuring them that their names will be remembered with honor among the other great Rangers of history.

Further reading
 "Exclusive Interview: David J. Fielding Talks About Life As Zordon" by Jordan Desjardins, Sciencefiction.com (April 16, 2015)
 Kinderculture: The Corporate Construction Of Childhood edited by Shirley R. Steinberg, Avalon Publishing (1997), pg 121-124
 Contemporary Media Culture and the Remnants of a Colonial Past by Kent A. Ono, Peter Lang (2009), pg 72-79

References

External links
 Official Power Rangers Website

Extraterrestrial superheroes
Television characters introduced in 1993
Fictional characters who use magic
Power Rangers characters